Kerch Bay is a bay of the Sea of Azov and Strait of Kerch in the eastern Crimea region.

It is located at the eastern Kerch Peninsula, near the municipality of Kerch.

Archaeology

In 2017, a head of an ancient Greek God was discovered during underwater construction operations at the Kerch Bay. It was crafted sometime between the 5th and 3rd centuries BC.

References

Bays of Crimea
Kerch Peninsula
Bays of the Sea of Azov
Kerch Strait